William Prescot (1788–1875) was an American physician, politician, and naturalist.

Biography
William Prescot was born in Gilmanton, New Hampshire, December 29, 1788. He was indentured to a farmer at sixteen years of age, received few educational advantages, taught, studied medicine, and in 1815 graduated at Dartmouth Medical School. He practised in Gilmanton and Lynn, and served in both branches of the Connecticut State Legislature. Dr. Prescott was an enthusiastic collector of minerals and shells, and was a member of many literary and scientific societies. He died in New Haven, Connecticut, on October 18, 1875.

Works
He wrote the Prescott Memorial (Boston, 1870).

Notes

References

1788 births
1875 deaths
American naturalists
Physicians from New Hampshire
Members of the New Hampshire House of Representatives
People from Gilmanton, New Hampshire
New Hampshire state senators
19th-century American politicians